Habben Michael (born 7 January 1993) is an Ethiopia-born Eritrean-British fashion model and entrepreneur. She is a co-founder at R.O.A.D. Entertainment Group, and serves as Fellow of the Royal Society of Arts for the R.O.A.D. Academy and Training Centre, London, UK.

Early life and education 
Michael was born on January 7, 1993, in Addis Ababa, Ethiopia, where she attended Bole Senior Secondary and Preparatory School. At age 15, she moved to Kenya, where she was discovered by a landscape photographer. After that, she started working for Kenyan modeling agency Surazuri, which sent her to work in London at age 16.

In 2013, Hong Kong-based modeling agency UNIK Models signed a management deal naming it Michael's exclusive agent in Asia. The agency represented her until 2014.

Modeling

After being discovered by a photographer, Michael started working for Kenyan modeling agency Surazuri, which sent her to work in London at age 16.

Her career in the fashion industry flourished when she modelled for international fashion and lifestyle broadcasting television channel Fashion TV. Michael appeared in campaigns for brands such as BCBG, Max Azria, Bell & Ross and Goldgenie.

Major campaigns

Business

R.O.A.D. Entertainment (Global)

Michael was appointed Chief Administrative Officer at R.O.A.D. Group Global, parent company to R.O.A.D. Entertainment. Michael has built her profile in business around the world with administrative expansions amassing various contacts in global markets including Africa and Asia. She now started collaborating with brands such as Origins.

Serial entrepreneur and entertainment magnate Teriy Keys was quoted "Habben's prolific understanding of media production has cognitively blended the art of creativity with effective business; when you manage to combine the two with the knowledge of foreign markets, your create an unparalleled unique business model."

References

External links

Official Website  

1993 births
Living people
People from Addis Ababa
Eritrean emigrants to England
Eritrean actresses